Chakhdikna (Kaitag: Чӏаӏхӏдикӏна; Dargwa: ЧяхӀдикӀна) is a rural locality (a selo) in Akhmedkentsky Selsoviet, Kaytagsky District, Republic of Dagestan, Russia. The population was 217 as of 2010. There are 3 streets.

Geography
Chakhdikna  is located 11 km northwest of Madzhalis (the district's administrative centre) by road. Surkhachi and Kudagu are the nearest rural localities.

Nationalities 
Dargins live there.

References 

Rural localities in Kaytagsky District